The International Union of Painters and Allied Trades (IUPAT) is a union representing about 100,000 painters, glaziers, wall coverers, flooring installers, convention and trade show decorators, glassworkers, sign and display workers, asbestos worker/hazmat technician and drywall finishers in the United States and Canada. Most of its members work in the construction industry.

Originally called the Brotherhood of Painters and Decorators of America, the union was first formed in 1887. Local unions belong to district councils. District councils perform most of the services of the union. IUPAT is affiliated with the AFL–CIO in the U.S.

The Painters was one of three unions (SEIU and AFSCME were the others) to endorse Howard Dean during the 2004 Democratic primaries. In a surprise move in 2008, IUPAT endorsed Republican presidential candidate Mike Huckabee. The union had endorsed Hillary Clinton in the Democratic primaries, and endorsed Barack Obama for president in June 2008. They endorsed Hillary Clinton in the 2016 Democratic Presidential Primary.

References

External links

 IUPAT official Web site

AFL–CIO
Canadian Labour Congress
Painters' and decorators' trade unions
Trade unions established in 1887